Paul L. D. Blair (February 1, 1944 – December 26, 2013) was an American professional baseball player and coach. He played in Major League Baseball as an outfielder from  through , most notably as the center fielder for the Baltimore Orioles dynasty that won four American League pennants and two World Series championships between 1966 and 1971. He also played for the New York Yankees and the Cincinnati Reds.

One of the best defensive outfielders of his era, he had excellent range and was brilliant at tracking fly balls. He challenged hitters by playing shallow, then running down balls hit over his head. In 1984, Blair was inducted into the Baltimore Orioles Hall of Fame.

Early life
Blair was born in Cushing, Oklahoma but grew up in Los Angeles where he attended Manual Arts High School. An accomplished athlete, he played basketball, baseball and ran track while a student. After spending the  season in their farm system, he was selected by the Orioles in the 1962 first-year draft on November 26, 1962.

Major league career

Baltimore Orioles
In  he batted .277 on an Orioles team that won the World Series. In Games 3 and 4 of that series, which the Frank Robinson-led Orioles swept from the defending champion Los Angeles Dodgers in four games, Blair played a major role in 1–0 shutouts by Wally Bunker and Dave McNally respectively, hitting a 430-foot home run off Claude Osteen in Game 3, and robbing Jim Lefebvre of an eighth-inning home run that would have tied Game 4. Blair also caught Lou Johnson's fly ball for the final out of the Series.

In  Blair established a career high .293 batting average with 11 home runs and 64 RBIs, along with an American League-leading 12 triples. He also won the first of his eight Gold Glove Awards. Batting second behind Don Buford in the Orioles' lineup, he hit .285 with career highs in home runs (26), runs batted in (76) and runs (102). His 26 homers along with 20 stolen bases made him the first Orioles player to achieve at least 20 in each category in the same season. His Orioles won the pennant, with Blair becoming the first player to have 5 hits in a post-season game, with 5 hits in 6 at-bats against the Minnesota Twins on October 6. The Orioles lost to the Miracle Mets in the World Series. Blair went 2-for-20 in that Series, including being the victim of one of Tommie Agee's two spectacular catches in Game 3 (Agee had also robbed Elrod Hendricks earlier in the game). On that Agee catch, Blair was the first batter Nolan Ryan faced in a World Series—the only World Series game the Hall of Fame pitcher would participate in. One of Blair's two hits came in the seventh inning of Game 2; it broke up Jerry Koosman's bid for a no-hitter.

Blair was beaned by Ken Tatum in the eighth inning of a 6–1 loss to the California Angels at Anaheim Stadium on May 31, 1970. He sustained a broken nose, orbital floor fractures below his left eye and a broken cheekbone. The beaning was unintentional, as Tatum had grazed the jersey front of the previous batter Boog Powell. Blair returned to the starting lineup three weeks later, finishing the season batting .267. After going 1 for 13 in the American League Championship Series, he had the World Series' highest batting average and on-base percentage with .474 and .524 respectively and shared with Series MVP Brooks Robinson the five-game Fall Classic record with nine hits apiece. Jim Palmer wrote that "ever since he got hit by a pitch, he isn't the hitter he was."

In  Blair took up switch-hitting but stopped after batting only .193 (11-for-57). He finished the season hitting .262. His Orioles won another pennant, but lost the World Series to the Pittsburgh Pirates in seven games.

During the 1971 World Series, Blair earned a place in baseball history in Game 4 by being the first man to bat in a World Series night game. Leading off the top of the first inning, Blair singled off Pittsburgh's Luke Walker.

Blair's speed going back in the outfield enabled him to play shallow, and make catches à la Willie Mays. In each of the Orioles' three straight World Series seasons, Blair won a Gold Glove. He also won a Gold Glove over each of the next four seasons, his last Gold Glove in  coinciding with teammate Brooks Robinson winning his 16th consecutive — and last — Gold Glove at third base.

New York Yankees
Blair was traded by the Orioles to the New York Yankees for Elliott Maddox and Rick Bladt on January 20, 1977. The transaction was driven by general manager Gabe Paul's desire to exile Maddox from the Yankees. Blair was primarily a defensive outfielder replacement in the late innings. On June 18 of that year in a nationally televised game against the Boston Red Sox at Fenway Park, he was tangentially involved in one of the most bizarre scenes in baseball history. Yankee manager Billy Martin took right fielder Reggie Jackson out of the game and replaced him with Blair after Jackson had misplayed Jim Rice's fly ball for a double. As the cameras watched, Jackson and Martin nearly came to blows. Blair's walk-off RBI single to left off Rick Rhoden won Game 1 of the 1977 World Series for the Yankees.

Actor Seth Gilliam played Blair in one episode of the ESPN mini-series The Bronx Is Burning. The mini-series chronicled the 1977 Yankees season.

Cincinnati Reds and second Yankees stint
He retired after the Yankees released him a second time, on July 1 of that year.

Career summary
In his 17-year career, Blair, whose nickname, "Motormouth", came from his talkative nature, batted .250 with 134 home runs and 620 RBI, 1513 hits and 171 stolen bases in 1947 games played. He was also one of the top bunters in the game, recording at least 10 sacrifice hits four times in his career, including 17 during the 1975 season.

Palmer loved having Blair in the outfield because of his fielding ability. In his 1996 book Palmer and Weaver: Together We Were Eleven Foot Nine, he reminisced about the time Weaver gave him three batting lineups to choose from for a game. "I'm looking basically for one thing," Palmer wrote.  "Center field. We've got Paul Blair, who I personally think can field anything." According to Palmer, Blair caught 12 fly balls that night. Palmer also thought Blair "was worth two runs, defensively, every game."

Coaching career
At the end of his playing career, Blair was hired as an outfield instructor for the Yankees in 1981. In August 1982, he was named the head coach at Fordham University. Blair coached only one season at Fordham with the team finishing with a 14–19 record. He then went back to work as an outfield instructor with the Houston Astros and as a third base coach for the Orioles Triple A team in Rochester and worked in that capacity until 1985.

In 1989, he played for the Gold Coast Suns in the newly formed Senior Professional Baseball Association, though the league folded after the season. Blair got his next shot at coaching in 1995 when he was named the manager of the Yonkers Hoot Owls in the newly formed Northeast League, an independent league of professional baseball. The team lasted just one season and finished a dismal 12–52.

Blair got his next, and last, shot at coaching in 1998 when he was named as the head coach for the Coppin State College baseball team. Blair coached the team from 1998–2002. Unfortunately, his overall record at Coppin State was a disappointing 30–185.

In the mid-1990s Blair was named the assistant general manager of the yet-to-be named New Orleans franchise in the United Baseball League (UBL) (which was a planned third major league).

Later life and death

After his retirement from coaching, Blair lived in Woodstock, Maryland with his wife, Gloria. In his retirement, Blair often appeared in celebrity golf and bowling tournaments. At the time of his death, he was known for working out at Triangle Fitness in Eldersburg, Maryland and bowling at Kings Point Lanes in Reisterstown, Maryland. His son Paul Blair III played eight years in the minors for the San Francisco Giants and the Chicago Cubs.

On December 26, 2013, Blair suffered a heart attack and lost consciousness while playing in a celebrity bowling tournament in Pikesville, Maryland. He was taken by ambulance to Sinai Hospital in Baltimore, where he was pronounced dead.

See also
 List of Major League Baseball career stolen bases leaders
 List of Major League Baseball annual triples leaders

References

External links

, or Retrosheet, or SABR Biography Project

1944 births
2013 deaths
African-American baseball players
American League All-Stars
Baltimore Orioles players
Baseball players from Oklahoma
Cangrejeros de Santurce (baseball) players
Cincinnati Reds players
Coppin State Eagles baseball coaches
Elmira Pioneers players
Fordham Rams baseball coaches
Gold Coast Suns (baseball) players
Gold Glove Award winners
Liga de Béisbol Profesional Roberto Clemente outfielders
Major League Baseball center fielders
Minor league baseball coaches
New York Yankees players
People from Cushing, Oklahoma
People from Woodstock, Maryland
Rochester Red Wings coaches
Rochester Red Wings players
Santa Barbara Rancheros players
Stockton Ports players
Baseball coaches from Oklahoma
20th-century African-American sportspeople
21st-century African-American people